Australian Kriol is an English-based creole language that developed from a pidgin used initially in the region of Sydney and Newcastle in New South Wales, Australia, in the early days of European colonisation. Later, it was spoken by groups further west and north. The pidgin died out in most parts of the country, except in the Northern Territory, where the contact between European settlers, Chinese and other Asians and the Aboriginal Australians in the northern regions has maintained a vibrant use of the language, spoken by about 30,000 people. Despite its similarities to English in vocabulary, it has a distinct syntactic structure and grammar and is a language in its own right. It is distinct from Torres Strait Creole.

History
European settlement in the Northern Territory was attempted over a period of about forty years. Settlement finally succeeded in 1870, and an influx of both English and Chinese speakers followed. In order to communicate between these two groups and the local Aboriginal people, pidgins developed throughout the territory based on Port Jackson Pidgin English. By 1900, Northern Territory Pidgin English (NTPE) was widespread and well understood.

It creolised first in the Roper River Mission (Ngukurr), where cattle stations were established and a township developed.

During this period, the relations between the native and European people were strained. Aboriginal people fiercely defended their lands. However, the control of lands was eventually seized by the settlers, when a cattle company acquired much of the area. The settlers became more determined to take full control of the land from the native people and carried out a campaign to do so.

The resettlements and land seizures nearly annihilated the indigenous population and also provided one major factor in the development of the creole: drastic social change accompanied by severe communication difficulties.

The second requirement for the development of the creole was a new community, which came about when Anglican missionaries set up a refuge in the Roper River region in 1908. This brought together around 200 people from eight different aboriginal ethnic groups, who spoke different native languages. Although the adults were multilingual because of frequent meetings and ceremonies, the children had yet to acquire their native language skills and so used the only common language they had: the NTPE. In their lifetime, these children were almost totally responsible for developing the pidgin into a full language.

Although the relations between the missionaries and Aboriginal people were friendly, the missions were not responsible for the development of Kriol. In fact, they tried to introduce Standard English as the official language for the mission, which the Aboriginal children used in class and with the missionaries, but Kriol still flourished.

Kriol was not recognised as a language until the 1970s, as it was regarded as a dialect of English rather than a language in its own right.

Varieties

Kriol is very widely spoken in the Katherine area, but there are minor differences between the varieties of Kriol spoken in particular areas. Some speakers of Kriol prefer to refer to their language by their unique name. However, the varieties are quite similar. Debate is ongoing about whether the varieties should be named differently to highlight their different social significance or the varieties should all be lumped into one big category of Kriol.

The differences are not actually that large: Mari Rhydwen compares the distinction to the distinction between American and British English.

Roper River (Ngukurr) Kriol is also spoken in Barunga, and in the Daly River area a mutually intelligible variety is spoken, but Daly River speakers do not consider themselves to be Kriol speakers. There is the question of whether the varieties should be understood as different forms of Kriol to strengthen the identities of the respective region or they all should be seen as Kriol and potentially have a better chance of funding for bilingual education programs.

Kriol Bible translation
On 5 May 2007, the first complete edition of the Bible in the Kriol language was launched at Katherine in the Northern Territory. Translation took over 29 years. It was undertaken by a team of native Kriol speakers led by Rev. Canon Gumbuli Wurrumara and specialists from the Society for Australian Indigenous Languages.

The Kriol Bible is the first complete edition of the Bible in any indigenous Australian language. The publication was a joint venture of The Bible Society, Lutheran Bible Translators, The Church Missionary Society, the Anglican church, Wycliffe Bible Translators, and the Australian Society of Indigenous Languages. The following is Genesis 1:1,2 from this translation: ""

Dialects
Dialects of Kriol include Roper River Kriol (Roper River Pidgin), Bamyili Creole (from the Barunga area), Barkly Kriol, Fitzroy Valley Kriol, and Daly River Kriol.

Current issues
A problem facing many communities in Northern Australia is that creole-speaking children are treated as though they speak English, but speak it badly, so they do not receive education in English as a second language. On the other hand, because they are not regarded as having a native mother tongue, they are denied access to education in their traditional language.

The only official bilingual language program in Kriol is at Barunga, which was established during the Whitlam government, and has successfully included Kriol as both a medium and an object of study. Funding is scarce for any further development of programs. Although Kriol is widely spoken, its literal translation is minimal, with the exception of the Bible, and stories produced for the bilingual program which are available through the Living Archive of Aboriginal Languages. This means that literacy rates of Kriol are quite low. Apart from practical implications of this, especially if English literacy is also low (i.e., written communication, education opportunities), it means that traditional stories are either not recorded in written form, or the Ngukurr people must rely on texts from Barunga, which may lessen the identity distinction between the two groups. However, Aboriginal cultures are not traditionally rooted in written records, so the lack of written versions of texts may be a function of the oral nature of Aboriginal storytelling.

References

 Harris, John (1993) "Losing and gaining a language: the story of Kriol in the Northern Territory" in Walsh, M and Yallop, C (eds), Language and Culture in Aboriginal Australia, Aboriginal Studies Press, Canberra.

External links

 Meigim Kriol Strongbala Bilingual Kriol-English website providing news and information on Kriol.
 Ngukurr Community site for the main Aboriginal Community producing Kriol language materials.
 Kriol language resources
 Kriol-English Dictionary Retrieved 25 December 2014.
 
 The Kriol Bible, full text Retrieved 13 January 2020.
 Kriol materials from the Barunga bilingual program at the Living Archive of Aboriginal Languages
 Roper Gulf Regional Council Retrieved 25 December 2014.

English-based pidgins and creoles of Australia